Stevens is an extinct town in Union County, in the U.S. state of South Dakota.

History
Stevens was laid out in 1922 by W. W. Stevens, and named for him. A post office called Stevens was established in 1923, and remained in operation until 1952, when it was renamed "North Sioux City".

References

Geography of Union County, South Dakota
Ghost towns in South Dakota